Paul Hamlyn, Baron Hamlyn,  (12 February 1926 – 31 August 2001) was a German-born British publisher and philanthropist, who established the Paul Hamlyn Foundation in 1987.

Early life
He was born Paul Bertrand Wolfgang Hamburger in Berlin, Germany, in 1926. His parents were Richard Hamburger, a paediatrician at the Charité Hospital in Berlin, and his wife, Lili, a Quaker of Polish descent.

When the National Socialists came to power and his father was forced out of his profession, the Hamburger family, who were Jewish, moved to London. Upon their arrival, the family lived in St. John's Wood and Paul was educated at St. Christopher's, a Quaker school in Letchworth, Hertfordshire.

His father died in 1940 when Paul was 14. Shortly afterwards he changed his surname to Hamlyn, which he picked out of the telephone directory.

Career
He began his publishing career in 1949, selling books from a wheelbarrow in Camden, north-west London. In 1965 he set up Music for Pleasure records as a joint venture with EMI. He transformed Paul Hamlyn Group and Octopus Publishing Group, now owned by Hachette Livre, into major UK publishing houses.

His success was developed on the idea of publishing eye-catching, glossy books in colour that appealed to a non-literary retail market. In 1961, for example, he published Marguerite Patten's seminal domestic cookery book Everyday Cook Book in Colour, a great success that established Hamlyn in the cookery retail market. The Everyday Cook Book in Colour had sold in excess of one million copies by 1969. Hamlyn used colour at a time when it was unusual and expensive for book publishers to do so, accessing printers and publishers in Czechoslovakia, such as Artia, for the purpose. It was one of several innovations that included selling his books in retail outlets such as supermarkets and hardware shops, in addition to the usual literary outlets.

Awards
In 1993 Hamlyn became the University of West London’s first Chancellor, and was also awarded a Royal Society of Arts medal. He was appointed a CBE in the 1993 Birthday Honours and made a British Life Peer on 23 February 1998, taking the title Baron Hamlyn, of Edgeworth in the County of Gloucestershire.

Philanthropy and legacy
He established the Paul Hamlyn Foundation in 1987 as a focus for his charitable interests, and it is now one of the UK's largest independent grant-giving organisations. The foundation administers Awards for Artists, the objectives of which include to "encourage artists to continue to practice despite outside pressures, financial or otherwise".

The reference library within the British Museum Reading Room was named the Paul Hamlyn Library in 2000, following funding by his foundation, although the British Museum took the decision to permanently close the Paul Hamlyn Library as of August 2011. The Paul Hamlyn Library that opened at the University of West London in September 2015 is unconnected with the former British Museum Reading Room reference library of the same name.

In May 2007 the Royal Opera House announced that the Floral Hall atrium will be renamed Paul Hamlyn Hall in his honour, following a £10m endowment from his foundation to the Paul Hamlyn Education Fund that will be used by the Royal Opera House to support its education and community activities.

Personal life
Hamlyn married first Eileen Watson, with whom he had two children, Michael and Jane, and secondly Helen Guest (in 1970), who survives him. Helen Hamlyn is a designer and philanthropist, who heads the Helen Hamlyn Trust.

Paul Hamlyn's brother Michael Hamburger (1924–2007) was a poet and translator.

Death
Hamlyn died aged 75 on 31 August 2001.

Arms

See also
 Other European émigrés who became British publishers include André Deutsch, Ernest Hecht and George Weidenfeld.

Sources
 Tim Rix, "Hamlyn, Paul Bertrand Wolfgang, Baron Hamlyn (1926–2001)", Oxford Dictionary of National Biography, online edition, Oxford University Press, January 2005 accessed 8 May 2007

References

Further reading
 Philip Jarvis and Sue Thomson, "Paul Hamlyn: The Must Be A Better Way...", in: Richard Abel and Gordon Graham, eds, Immigrant Publishers: The Impact of Expatriate Publishers in Britain and America in the 20th Century, New Brunswick, NJ: Transaction Publishers, 2009;  Routledge, 2017.
 John Rossello, "The Merchandiser", The Guardian, 26 February 1962, p. 7.
 "Hamlyn, Paul Bertrand", in: Werner Röder, Herbert A. Strauss, eds.,  Biographisches Handbuch der deutschsprachigen Emigration nach 1933, Band 1: Politik, Wirtschaft, Öffentliches Leben, Munich: Saur, 1980, p. 267.
 "Paul Bertrand Hamlyn, Publisher and philanthropist, 1926-2001: How to make money - and give it away", The Sydney Morning Herald, 8 September 2001, p. 42.
 "Profile, Paul Hamlyn: A publisher ready to be damned", The Observer, 30 November 1986, p. 11

External links
 Paul Hamlyn Foundation website
Hamlyn website (archive), 28 April 1999 at the Wayback Machine
Hamlyn website (archive), 12 February 2005 at the Wayback Machine
 Hamlyn website (archive), 9 April 2007 at the Wayback Machine
 Octopus Publishing Group website
 "Lord Hamlyn bequeaths £200m to good causes", The Daily Telegraph, 22 November 2001
 "Lord Hamlyn leaves £200m to charity", BBC News, 24 November 2001

Two groups of WorldCat attributions to Paul Hamlyn both mix works published by Paul Hamlyn and works by a writer or illustrator Paul Hamlyn, evidently as of March 2020: 
 "Hamlyn, Paul 1926-2001" at WorldCat
 "Hamlyn, Paul" at WorldCat

1926 births
2001 deaths
English book publishers (people)
English philanthropists
Labour Party (UK) life peers
Commanders of the Order of the British Empire
English Jews
German emigrants to England
Jewish emigrants from Nazi Germany to the United Kingdom
People educated at St Christopher School, Letchworth
Bevin Boys
Naturalised citizens of the United Kingdom
Businesspeople from London
20th-century British philanthropists
20th-century English businesspeople
Life peers created by Elizabeth II